Community Forests International (CFI) is a charity that works with sustainability in forests.

The CFI headquarters is located in Sackville, New Brunswick, Canada. The organization was founded in 2007 by Jeff Schnurr. After traveling to over 35 countries and working as a Canadian tree-planter, Schnurr landed in Pemba, Tanzania. While living there, he was approached by a group of local fishermen who were interested in tree planting as a means for stabilizing the local environment.

CFI's operating model is communities need to make their own change. In April 2009, CFI helped Tanzanians in Pemba incorporate their own organization, Community Forests Pemba (CFP).

In 2010, Jeff was named one of Canada's Top 10 volunteers by the CBC Canada's Champions of Change a program run by the Canadian Broadcasting Corporation with the goal of recognizing some of Canada's most active volunteers.

Community Forests Pemba (CFP) 
Traditional agriculture, charcoal production and population expansion have left natural forest systems largely depleted across the island of Pemba, Tanzania. For this reason Pembans have needed to import wood and charcoal while soil systems have been depleted.

While living in Pemba, Schnurr worked in partnership with Mbarouk Mussa Omar, a local activist to organize gardeners, tree growers and foresters in order to fight land degradation and to empower communities to sustainably manage their own resources in an economically viable way. Since 2007, CFI in partnership with CFP has launched 14 community-owned projects in Tanzania, operated by 1,800 locals, 70 percent of them women. As of May 22, 2013, over 1,000,000 trees have been planted in collaboration between farmers, local foresters, government and communities in Pemba. They have provided this community with countless help, providing access to clean water, as well as giving hope to their community.

Whaelghinbran Farm 
In 2012, CFI raised over $100,000 to purchase Whaelghinbran Farm, a 580-acre farm and forest property near Sussex, New Brunswick, Canada. The land belonged to Clark Phillips and Susan Tyler, a couple who had been farming organically and restoring the forest since the early 70s. The property boasts more than 70 acres of certified organic farmland; in its early years Phillips and Tyler hosted Green Party MP Elizabeth May.

Through CFI, the farm is currently being used as an incubator space for the next generation of Canadian land stewards. The organization currently hosts workshops, an organic farmer apprentice program and horse logging at the farm.

References

Non-profit organizations based in New Brunswick
Environmental organizations based in New Brunswick